Mount Kent is a mountain on East Falkland, Falkland Islands, and is  high.
It is located north of Mount Challenger.

History 

The mountain saw action during the Falklands War during the Assault on Mount Kent, part of the larger Battle of Mount Harriet. Some of the location is still mined.

The mountain's top is occupied by the RRH Mount Kent (Remote Radar Head Mount Kent) of the British Forces South Atlantic Islands (BFSAI), part of an early warning and airspace control network including also RRH Mount Alice and RRH Byron Heights on West Falkland.

References

Kent
Military of the Falkland Islands